Aspergillus sepultus is a species of fungus in the genus Aspergillus. It is from the Cremei section. The species was first described in 1986.

Growth and morphology

A. sepultus has been cultivated on both Czapek yeast extract agar (CYA) plates and Malt Extract Agar Oxoid® (MEAOX) plates. The growth morphology of the colonies can be seen in the pictures below.

References 

sepultus
Fungi described in 1986